VIV or Viv may refer to:

People
 Viv (given name), a list of people and fictional characters
 Viv., the standard author abbreviation of Domenico Viviani (1772–1840), Italian botanist and naturalist

Places
 2558 Viv, a main belt asteroid
 VIV, IATA airport code for Vivigani Airfield, Papua New Guinea

Groups, organizations, companies
 the NYSE stock symbol for Vivo Participacoes
 the Euronext stock symbol for Vivendi

Other uses
 Vortex induced vibration
 Viv (software), personal assistance software
 .viv, the filename extension of Vivo video files

See also

 
 
 V/V (five of five)
 v/v (volume by volume)
 Viiv (disambiguation)